Courchevel Altiport  is an altiport serving Courchevel, a ski resort in the French Alps. The airfield has a very short runway of only  with a gradient of 18.6%. There is no go-around procedure for landings at Courchevel due to the surrounding mountainous terrain. The airfield primarily sees use by smaller fixed-wing aircraft such as the Cessna 208 Caravan, as well as helicopters. The runway has no instrument approach procedure or lighting aids, making landing in fog or low clouds unsafe and almost impossible.

The airport is considered dangerous, as it features a difficult approach, an upward-sloping runway and ski runs in the adjacent area. The History Channel program Most Extreme Airports ranks it as the seventh most extreme airport in the world.

Commercial service 
In the 1980s, Tyrolean Airways served Courchevel using Dash-7 STOL aircraft capable of carrying 54 passengers. More recently, De Havilland Canada DHC-6 Twin Otters and DHC-7 Dash 7 turboprops have served the airport. According to their website, Alpine Airlines is currently the only company worldwide to offer commercial flights to Courchevel Altiport.

Statistics

References

External links

Photo of DHC-7 on runway
Airport information 

Airports in Auvergne-Rhône-Alpes
Buildings and structures in Savoie
Altiports